Acts 19 is the nineteenth chapter of the Acts of the Apostles in the New Testament of the Christian Bible. It records part of the third missionary journey of Paul. The author of the book containing this chapter is anonymous but early Christian tradition uniformly affirmed that Luke composed this book as well as the Gospel of Luke.

Text
The original text was written in Koine Greek. This chapter is divided into 41 verses.

Textual witnesses
Some early manuscripts containing the text of this chapter are:
 Papyrus 38 (~AD 250)
 Codex Vaticanus (325–350)
 Codex Sinaiticus (330–360)
 Codex Bezae (~400)
 Codex Alexandrinus (400–440)
 Codex Laudianus (~550)

Locations
{{Location map+
| Mediterranean
| width=500
| float=right
| label= Central and eastern Mediterranean Sea
| caption= Places mentioned in (blue) and related to (black) this chapter.
| relief = yes
| places= {{Location map~| Mediterranean
|lat= 43.0 |long= 12
     |mark= Blue_pog.svg
     |marksize=1
     |label= Italy 
     |background=
     |label_size= 80
     |position= top
    }}
}}
This chapter mentions the following places (in the order of appearance):
 Corinth
 Ephesus
 Asia (Roman province)
 Macedonia
 Achaia
 Jerusalem
 Rome

Timeline

This part of the third missionary journey of Paul took place in ca. AD 53–55.

Paul's ministry in Ephesus (19:1–22)
This part covers Paul's long stay (almost 3 years) in Ephesus, where he encountered "some disciples" of John the Baptist and confronted the influence of magic and occult in that city.

Verse 4Then Paul said, "John indeed baptized with a baptism of repentance, saying to the people that they should believe on Him who would come after him, that is, on Christ Jesus"."Believe on him" is the translation used by the King James Version and New King James Version. The more natural phrase "believe in him" is used by the New American Standard Bible.

Verse 5When they heard this, they were baptized in the name of the Lord Jesus.Verse 14
 Also there were seven sons of Sceva, a Jewish chief priest, who did so (i.e. attempted to heal using the name of the Lord Jesus).Sceva was a Jew called a "chief priest". Some scholars note that it was not uncommon for some members of the Zadokite clan to take on an unofficial high-priestly role, which may explain this moniker.

In this verse, it is recorded that he had seven sons who attempted to exorcise a demon from a man in Ephesus by using the name of Jesus as an invocation. This practice is similar to the Jewish practice, originating in the Testament of Solomon, of invoking Angels to cast out demons. Sorcery and exorcism are mentioned several times in Acts: Simon Magus and Elymas Bar-Jesus, and divination is illustrated by the girl at Philippi. "She was regarded as spirit-possessed, and it was the spirit who was addressed and expelled by Paul in ".

Verse 15
 And the evil spirit answered and said, “Jesus I know, and Paul I know; but who are you?”This evil spirit had heard of both Jesus and Paul, but not of the seven sons of Sceva, which soon received 'such a beating' from the spirit 'that they ran'; theologian Conrad Gempf argues that this shows that power over evil spirits does not work in a mechanical way in the name of Jesus, but because one knows Jesus and, more importantly, is known by him.

 Verse 19 Also, many of those who had practiced magic brought their books together and burned them in the sight of all. And they counted up the value of them, and it totaled fifty thousand pieces of silver."50,000 pieces of silver": or "50,000 drachmas" (1 drachma represents the average wage for a day) representing over 135 years' wages.

Verse 21When these things were accomplished, Paul purposed in the Spirit, when he had passed through Macedonia and Achaia, to go to Jerusalem, saying, "After I have been there, I must also see Rome".Paul has already intended to have his trip to Jerusalem followed with a trip to Rome.

The riot in Ephesus (19:23–45)
The amount of money in the scroll-burning incident (19:19) must have stirred many people, whole livelihood (that is dependent on the selling of religious objects) is threatened by the successful growth of the Christian church, and now is bolstering a serious opposition.

Verse 29So the whole city was filled with confusion, and rushed into the theater with one accord, having seized Gaius and Aristarchus, Macedonians, Paul's travel companions."Aristarchus": One of Paul's travel companions, a Macedonian from Thessalonica, who is known from some references in the Acts of the Apostles (19:29; 20:4; 27:2) and Colossians 4:10.

Verse 33And they drew Alexander out of the multitude, the Jews putting him forward. And Alexander motioned with his hand, and wanted to make his defense to the people.''
"Alexander": was "to make a defense" for the Jews in order to distance themselves from the Christians. Could be the Alexander of 1 Timothy 1:20 and maybe the Alexander the Coppersmith of 2 Timothy 4:14.

See also
 Apollos
 Diana (mythology)
 Erastus of Corinth
 John the Baptist
 Timothy
 Related Bible parts: Acts 14, Acts 15, Acts 16, Acts 17, Acts 18, 1 Timothy 1, 2 Timothy 4

References

Sources

External links
 King James Bible – Wikisource
English Translation with Parallel Latin Vulgate
Online Bible at GospelHall.org (ESV, KJV, Darby, American Standard Version, Bible in Basic English)
Multiple bible versions at Bible Gateway (NKJV, NIV, NRSV etc.)

19